is a Japanese female mixed martial artist whose nickname is Vale Tudo Queen.

Tsuji was a prolific female mixed martial artist in the 2000s. Tsuji is a former Smackgirl tournament winner, Smackgirl Lightweight Champion and Valkyrie Featherweight Champion. MMA ranking system portal Fight Matrix ranked Tsuji as the #1 pound-for-pound Female Mixed Martial artist in the world in the years 2002, 2004 and 2005. Between 2002 to her retirement from MMA in 2012, she had frequently placed in the Top 5 of women's MMA fighters in flyweight and strawweight classes.

Early life
She graduated from the prestigious Chukyo Women's University; a university notable for its wrestling family. During her time there, Tsuji placed third in Women's Freestyle Wrestling (51 kg) in the 1997 Asian Championship.

Mixed martial arts career
Tsuji spent the majority of her career competing in the now-defunct Smackgirl promotion. This would be Hoshino's only loss in her MMA career.

In her ninth professional bout, she faced Brazilian fighter Ana Michelle Tavares. In this match, Tsuji injured her left shoulder. This was Tsuji's first defeat in MMA. She avenged this loss years later.

Tsuji won the title after defeating Watanabe by armbar at 3:51 of the first round. She would go on to successfully defend the title five times until the demise of the Smackgirl promotion.

On , Tsuji would get the chance to face Tavares again. At the event Smackgirl - Queens' Hottest Summer, Tsuji was able to avenge her only loss at the time by defeating Tavares via KO at 4:47 of the first round.

Her 14-fight winning streak came to an end on  when she rematched Mei Yamaguchi, who this time was able to defeat Tsuji with a rear-naked choke in only 76 seconds. This was just the second time that Tsuji was defeated and the first time that she was defeated by a fellow Japanese fighter. This is considered one of the biggest upsets in the history of women's mixed martial arts.

She defeated Ishioka by unanimous decision.

She was defeated by submission due to a kimura in the first round.

On , Tsuji faced Hyo Kyung Song at Deep Osaka Impact 2012. She defeated Song by technical submission due to an armbar in the first round.

Mixed martial arts record

|-
| Win
| align=center| 24-3
| Hyo Kyung Song
| Technical Submission (armbar)
| Deep: Osaka Impact 2012
| 
| align=center| 1
| align=center| 1:27
| Osaka, Japan
| 
|-
| Loss
| align=center| 23-3
| Ayaka Hamasaki
| Submission (kimura)
| Jewels 19th Ring
| 
| align=center| 1
| align=center| 3:41
| Osaka, Japan
| For Jewels Lightweight (115 lbs) Queen Championship
|-
| Win
| align=center| 23-2
| Saori Ishioka
| Decision (unanimous)
| Jewels 15th Ring
| 
| align=center| 2
| align=center| 5:00
| Tokyo, Japan
| 
|-
| Loss
| align=center| 22-2
| Mei Yamaguchi
| Submission (rear-naked choke)
| Valkyrie 04
| 
| align=center| 1
| align=center| 1:16
| Tokyo, Japan
| Lost Valkyrie Featherweight Championship
|-
| Win
| align=center| 22-1
| Kate Martinez
| Submission (armbar)
| Valkyrie 02
| 
| align=center| 1
| align=center| 4:20
| Tokyo, Japan
| Won inaugural Valkyrie Featherweight Championship
|-
| Win
| align=center| 21-1
| Mei Yamaguchi
| Decision (unanimous)
| Valkyrie 01
| 
| align=center| 3
| align=center| 3:00
| Tokyo, Japan
| 
|-
| Win
| align=center| 20-1
| Seo Hee Ham
| Decision (unanimous)
| Smackgirl - Starting Over
| 
| align=center| 3
| align=center| 5:00
| Tokyo, Japan
| Defended Smackgirl Lightweight Championship
|-
| Win
| align=center| 19-1
| Ana Michelle Tavares
| TKO (punches)
| Smackgirl - Queens' Hottest Summer
| 
| align=center| 1
| align=center| 4:47
| Tokyo, Japan
| Non-title bout
|-
| Win
| align=center| 18-1
| Thricia Poovey
| TKO (punches)
| Smackgirl - The Dance of the Taisho Romance
| 
| align=center| 1
| align=center| 4:10
| Osaka, Japan
| Defended Smackgirl Lightweight Championship
|-
| Win
| align=center| 17-1
| Tomomi Sunaba
| Submission (rear-naked choke)
| Smackgirl - Top Girl Battle
| 
| align=center| 1
| align=center| 4:19
| Tokyo, Japan
| Defended Smackgirl Lightweight Championship in a "Winner Take All" match (Tsuji received both fight purses).
|-
| Win
| align=center| 16-1
| Cami Hostetler
| Submission (armbar)
| Smackgirl - Queen's Triumphant Return
| 
| align=center| 2
| align=center| 4:19
| Osaka, Japan
| Defended Smackgirl Lightweight Championship
|-
| Win
| align=center| 15-1
| Miyuki Ariga
| Submission (heel hook)
| MARS
| 
| align=center| 2
| align=center| 1:44
| Tokyo, Japan
| 
|-
| Win
| align=center| 14-1
| Maiko Ohkada
| Submission (armbar)
| Smackgirl - Dynamic!!
| 
| align=center| 2
| align=center| 2:10
| Tokyo, Japan
| Defended Smackgirl Lightweight Championship
|-
| Win
| align=center| 13-1
| Hisae Watanabe
| Submission (armbar)
| Smackgirl - Road to Dynamic!!
| 
| align=center| 1
| align=center| 3:51
| Tokyo, Japan
| Won Smackgirl Lightweight Championship
|-
| Win
| align=center| 12-1
| Erica Montoya
| Submission (armbar)
| Smackgirl - Holy Land Triumphal Return
| 
| align=center| 3
| align=center| 4:00
| Tokyo, Japan
| 
|-
| Win
| align=center| 11-1
| Chiaki Kawabita
| Submission (armbar)
| Smackgirl - Go West
| 
| align=center| 2
| align=center| 1:19
| Osaka, Japan
| 
|-
| Win
| align=center| 10-1
| Mayumi Hashiba
| Submission (kneebar)
| Smackgirl - F8
| 
| align=center| 1
| align=center| 2:20
| Tokyo, Japan
| 
|-
| Win
| align=center| 9-1
| Kaliopi Yeitsuidou
| Decision (unanimous)
| Inoki Bom-Ba-Ye 2003
| 
| align=center| 3
| align=center| 5:00
| Kobe, Japan
| 
|-
| Loss
| align=center| 8-1
| Ana Michelle Tavares
| Submission (triangle armbar)
| Deep - 11th Impact
| 
| align=center| 1
| align=center| 3:55
| Osaka, Japan
| 
|-
| Win
| align=center| 8-0
| Tomomi Sunaba
| Technical Submission (armbar)
| Smackgirl - Third Season 2
| 
| align=center| 1
| align=center| 4:37
| Tokyo, Japan
| 
|-
| Win
| align=center| 7-0
| Mari Kaneko
| Decision (unanimous)
| Smackgirl - Japan Cup 2002 Grand Final
| 
| align=center| 3
| align=center| 5:00
| Tokyo, Japan
| Became 2002 Japan Cup Middleweight Tournament Champion
|-
| Win
| align=center| 6-0
| Yumiko Sugimoto
| Submission (armbar)
| Smackgirl - Japan Cup 2002 Episode 2
| 
| align=center| 1
| align=center| 4:13
| Tokyo, Japan
| 
|-
| Win
| align=center| 5-0
| Eri Takahashi
| Submission (armbar)
| Smackgirl - Japan Cup 2002 Opening Round
| 
| align=center| 1
| align=center| 2:01
| Tokyo, Japan
| 
|-
| Win
| align=center| 4-0
| Noriko Tsunoda
| Submission (armbar)
| Smackgirl - Dynamic
| 
| align=center| 1
| align=center| 1:12
| Tokyo, Japan
| 
|-
| Win
| align=center| 3-0
| Izumi Noguchi
| Decision (split)
| AX - Vol. 3
| 
| align=center| 3
| align=center| 5:00
| Tokyo, Japan
| 
|-
| Win
| align=center| 2-0
| Hiromi Oka
| Submission (rear-naked choke)
| Smackgirl - Royal Smack 2002
| 
| align=center| 1
| align=center| 3:43
| Tokyo, Japan
| 
|-
| Win
| align=center| 1-0
| Ikuma Hoshino
| Submission (armbar)
| AX - Vol. 2: We Want To Shine
| 
| align=center| 3
| align=center| 3:37
| Tokyo, Japan
|

Championships and accomplishments
 Bronze in Women's Freestyle Wrestling at 51 kg in the 1997 Asian Championship.
 2002 JAPAN CUP middleweight tournament champion
 Inaugural Smackgirl Lightweight Champion (2005)
 Inaugural Valkyrie Featherweight Champion (2009)
Fight Matrix
2002 #1 Female Fighter of the Year
2004 #1 Female Fighter of the Year
2005 #1 Female Fighter of the Year

See also
 List of female mixed martial artists

References

External links
 
 Profile at Fightergirls.com
 Official blog 

Japanese female mixed martial artists
Mixed martial artists utilizing freestyle wrestling
Japanese female sport wrestlers
1974 births
Living people
Shigakkan University alumni
Asian Wrestling Championships medalists
Sportspeople from Osaka
20th-century Japanese women
21st-century Japanese women